Dahu is a railway station on the Taiwan Railways Administration (TRA) West Coast line located in Lujhu District, Kaohsiung, Taiwan.

History
The station was opened on 29 November 1900.

Nearby stations
Taiwan Railways Administration
  ⇐ West Coast line ⇒

Around the station
 Tung Fang Design Institute

See also
 List of railway stations in Taiwan

References

1900 establishments in Taiwan
Railway stations in Kaohsiung
Railway stations opened in 1900
Railway stations served by Taiwan Railways Administration